Piniphila is a genus of moths belonging to the subfamily Olethreutinae of the family Tortricidae.

Species
Piniphila bifasciana (Haworth, [1811])

See also
List of Tortricidae genera

References

External links
tortricidae.com

Tortricidae genera
Olethreutinae